Tilia platyphyllos, the large-leaved lime or large-leaved linden, is a species of flowering plant in the family Malvaceae (Tiliaceae). It is a deciduous tree, native to much of Europe, including locally in southwestern Great Britain, growing on lime-rich soils. The common names largeleaf linden and large-leaved linden are in standard use throughout the English-speaking world except in the British Isles, where it is known as large-leaved lime. The name "lime", possibly a corruption of "line" originally from "lind", has been in use for centuries and also attaches to other species of Tilia.  It is not, however, closely related to the lime fruit tree, a species of citrus.

The specific epithet platyphyllos (greek: πλατύφυλλος) means in greek "with broad leaves".

Description
Tilia platyphyllos is a narrowly domed tree with a moderate growth rate, and can eventually attain a height of 40 m. The reddish-brown young stems later develop dark grey bark with fine fissures and furrows. The branches spread upwards at wide angles. The twigs are reddish-green and slightly pubescent. The foliage consists of simple, alternately arranged leaves. As indicated by its common name, this tree has larger leaves than the related Tilia cordata (small-leaved lime), 6 to 9 cm (exceptionally 15 cm). They are ovate to cordate, mid to dark green above and below, with white downy hair on the underside, particularly along the veins, tapering into a mucronate tip. The margin is sharply serrate, and the base cordate; the venation is pinnate along a midrib. The pubescent petiole is usually 3–4 cm long, but can vary between 1.5–5 cm. The autumn foliage is yellow-green to yellow.

The small, fragrant, yellowish-white flowers are arranged in drooping, cymose clusters in groups of 3 to 4. Their whitish-green, leaf-like bracts have an oblong-obovate shape. The geniculate peduncles are between 1.5–3 cm long. The hermaphroditic flowers have 5 sepals and 5 tepals, numerous stamens, but no staminodes. The superior ovary is 2–10 locular with one smooth style. The flowers are pollinated by bees and some butterflies, notably the White-letter Hairstreak. The fruit is a fat, round, tomentose, cream-colored nutlet with a diameter of 1 cm or less. It has a woody shell with 3–5 ridges.

Cultivation
Tilia platyphyllos is widely planted throughout the temperate world as an ornamental tree in parks and city streets. Numerous cultivars are available, including  'Aurea', (golden leafed), 'Fastigiata', 'Laciniata' (seemingly torn leaves), 'Örebro' (columnar), 'Princes Street' (narrow crown), 'Rubra' (red twigged), 'Tortuosa' (twisted branches), and 'Tiltstone Filigree' (upswept branches).

The cultivar 'Rubra' has gained the Royal Horticultural Society's Award of Garden Merit.

Hybrids
Tilia platyphyllos readily hybridizes with Tilia cordata, the hybrid being the common lime T. × europaea (syn. T. × vulgaris).

Fossil record
Fossils of Tilia platyphyllos have been described from the fossil flora of Kızılcahamam district in Turkey, which is of early Pliocene age.

Use
Tilia wood is used for carving, and almost all parts of the tree can be used for fodder, ropes or firewood. Bast and honey, which were historically the main products of Tilia, may have been an important factor in the spread of the species and its status as a typical agroforestry tree in the Middle Ages. Tilia spp. are also important for amenity use, shelterbelts and game plantings in the open landscape, in urban areas and recreational forestry.

Traditional medicine
The plant also contains tannins that can act as an astringent.  The wood is burned to charcoal and ingested for intestinal disorders and used topically for edema or infection, such as cellulitis or of the lower leg.

Famous trees 
 300-year-old T. platyphyllos at Schloss Linderhof Bavaria – known in German as the "Koenigslinde".
 350-year-old T. platyphyllos at Schloss Holzheim Hesse – known as the "Landgrave's lime".
 700-year-old T. platyphyllos at Bojnice Castle, Slovakia – known in Slovak as "Bojnická lipa" ("the Bojnice Linden") or "Lipa kráľa Mateja" ("King Matej's Linden").
 550-year-old T. platyphyllos in Bracon, Jura, France – planted to mark the marriage of Marie de Bourgogne to Maximilian I of the House of Habsburg in Austria in 1477.

References

External links

 Tilia platyphyllos - distribution map, genetic conservation units and related resources. European Forest Genetic Resources Programme (EUFORGEN)

Flora of Ukraine
platyphyllos
Trees of Europe